Meganoton yunnanfuana is a moth of the family Sphingidae. It is known from Yunnan in southern China and northern Vietnam.

References

Meganoton
Moths described in 1925